Raven Ramirez is a character in CSI: Cyber. The character is portrayed by actress and singer Hayley Kiyoko. Despite being credited, Raven did not appear in "Selfie 2.0", "L0M1S" & "Click Your Poison" in the first season. Raven is also in a secret relationship with Brody Nelson.

Casting
In October 2014, it was announced that Kiyoko was cast as a regular and that her special skill was cyber trends and social media.

In an interview, Kiyoko said about Raven that she enjoys being very busy in her career. She also feels that it all works out with her time between music and acting.

Backstory
In URL Interrupted, Raven discusses with Sifter about her school life. Raven was bullied from the first grade and dropped out of school at the age of 15. Being bullied forced Raven to become a black hat hacker. Raven was arrested for hacking the national power grid in New Hampshire.Raven also mentioned to Brody that when she was in school she spent her lunchtime at the library and that the librarian was "practically her best friend."

Storylines
In "Kidnapping 2.0", Raven assists Brody Nelson in cracking a password to rescue kidnapped babies.

In "CMND:/Crash", Raven tells Brody that he isn't the only one who has had all his electronics taken from him by the FBI as part of probation.

In "Killer En Route," Raven helped track a car where the killer was inside.

In "Crowd Sourced", Raven made a clone website to try to locate and stop a bomber.

In "URL Interrupted", Raven and Mundo hack a missing teenager's phone to try to locate her. Raven then discovered that the missing girl was being cyberbullied. Raven opens up about her past and reveals that she was bullied which pushed her into becoming a black-hat hacker. Raven watched the girl's video about taking a hiatus from social media.

In "Family Secrets", Raven rescues Brody when he is attacked by Avery Ryan's stalker. She also covered for him when he didn't show up to work that morning.

In "Why-Fi", Raven quickly makes friends with D.B. Russell (Ted Danson) and it is revealed that she and Brody are secretly dating when they are seen making out in the shower together.

In "Heart Me", Raven has to help her friend who has been both hacked and set up for murder. Avery, Elijah and D. B. all help her prove the innocence of her friend.

References

CSI: Cyber characters
Television characters introduced in 2015
Fictional Federal Bureau of Investigation personnel
Fictional hackers
Fictional Asian-American people